Alfonso Cabello Llamas (born 19 September 1993) is a Spanish Paralympic cyclist. Representing Spain at the 2012 Summer Paralympics, Cabello won a gold medal in the men's 1 km time trial C4–5 at the 2012 and 2020 Summer Paralympics, taking the current world record in the latter.

Personal 
Cabello was born on 19 September 1993 in La Rambla without his left hand. As a child, his mother made sure that missing his hand would not get in the way of him doing things. She insisted he learn to tie his shoe laces without assistance and using his only hand.  Other sports he played as a child included basketball and swimming.  Swimming helped him develop better body balance in terms of being able to function using his stump and his right hand.  In physical education classes, teachers would tell him he would not need to meet the same standards as his classmates because of his disability.

In 2008, he was recognised at the Andalusian Federation of Sports for the Physically Handicapped gala. In 2009, he was one of fourteen athletes from Cordoba to get an Andalucía Olympic Foundation scholarship. In December 2013, he attended an event marking Spanish insurance company Santa Lucía Seguros becoming a sponsor of the Spanish Paralympic Committee, and consequently Plan ADOP which funds high performance Spanish disability sport competitors.  He chose to attend the event because he wanted to show support for this type of sponsorship. In 2013, Cabello was awarded the gold Real Orden al Mérito Deportivo.

Cycling 
When Cabello first learned to ride a bicycle, he used the stump on one hand to manipulate the brakes.  The first race he participated in was an exhibition one. From there, he quickly moved to provisional competitions.

In May 2008, he participated in the Third International Criterium Cycling Disability in France. Competing at the  European Cup Adapted Cycling in 2008, he finished sixteenth in the LC1 in the 56.4 kilometer long race. In 2011, he participated in the Spanish national disability cycling track championship, where he earned a first-place finish.
He competed in the 2011 World Championships. At the Los Angeles hosted 2012 Paralympic Cycling World Championships, he won a bronze medal in the C5 km race with a personal best time of 1:07.876.  He also participated in the team sprint event. He won a gold medal at the 2012 Summer Paralympics games in London, United Kingdom in the Men's 1 km time trial C4-5 taking the C5 world record from Jon-Allan Butterworth.  His gold medal was the first Gold won by Spain at the 2012 Games.

References 

Cyclists at the 2012 Summer Paralympics
Paralympic gold medalists for Spain
1993 births
Living people
Sportspeople from the Province of Córdoba (Spain)
Plan ADOP alumni
Medalists at the 2012 Summer Paralympics
People from Campiña Sur (Córdoba)
Paralympic cyclists of Spain
Medalists at the 2016 Summer Paralympics
Paralympic medalists in cycling
Medalists at the 2020 Summer Paralympics
Cyclists at the 2020 Summer Paralympics